Parmelia mayi is a species of foliose lichen in the family Parmeliaceae. It is found in the northern Appalachian Mountains of eastern North America, where it grows on rocks and on the trunks of paper birch and balsam fir. Parmelia mayi is morphologically indistinguishable from Parmelia saxatilis, but is distinct in its distribution, chemistry, and genetics.

Taxonomy
The lichen was formally described as a new species in 2011 by Pradeep Divakar, Ana Crespo, and Maria del Carmen Molina. Here it was found growing on the trunk of a paper birch tree (Betula papyrifera). Parmelia mayi is a formerly cryptic species that is a member of the species complex grouped around Parmelia saxatilis. Because of its close visible resemblance, it had previously been misidentified as that species until molecular phylogenetic analysis showed it to be genetically distinct. A 2016 study estimates that P. mayi diverged from others species in the P. saxatilis group during the Pleistocene, 0.4 million years ago. The study also showed that despite their morphological similarity, these two lichens are only distantly related to each other.

Description
The thallus surface, which features small pits and depressions, has pseudocyphellae (tiny pores for gas exchange) and isidia, but lacks soralia. The thallus undersurface is black with a brown margin, and has evenly distributed rhizines acting as holdfasts that attach the thallus to its substrate. The lichen contains the secondary compounds lichesterinic acid, protolichesterinic acid, nephrosterinic acid, and isonephrosterinic acid.

Habitat and distribution
It grows on siliceous rocks, in open oak forests, and on the trunks of balsam fir (Abies balsamea) and paper birch in spruce-fir forests.

References

mayi
Lichen species
Lichens described in 2011
Lichens of the Northeastern United States
Taxa named by Ana Crespo
Taxa named by Pradeep Kumar Divakar
Fungi without expected TNC conservation status